Bellaghy is a village in County Londonderry, Northern Ireland. It lies north west of Lough Neagh and about 5 miles north east of Magherafelt. In the centre of the village (known locally as The Diamond) three main roads lead to Magherafelt, Portglenone and Toome. It had a population of 1,063 people in the 2001 Census and is within Mid-Ulster District.

Bellaghy is home to a well-preserved 17th century fortified house, Bellaghy Bawn, which is now a museum. It is also known as the birthplace, childhood home and resting place of poet Seamus Heaney (1939–2013), who won the Nobel Prize for Literature. There is an arts centre in the village dedicated to Heaney.

History 
There had long been Gaelic settlements in this area. Archaeological evidence has been found in the village of a Gaelic ringfort.

In the early 17th century, Bellaghy became one of many towns planned, built and settled under the authority of the Vintners Company of London, as part of the English Plantation of Ulster. In 1622, according to a manuscript of a Captain Thomas Ash, Bellaghy consisted of a church, a castle, a corn mill and twelve houses.

During the Plantation, English colonials built a fortified house in the village. It had surrounding walls and two circular towers at opposite corners. Recent excavations have revealed that the fortified house was built on the site of a former Gaelic ringfort. During the 1641 rebellion the house was attacked by Irish rebels, but it remained intact. Many other houses in the village were burnt to the ground. Locally it was called "The Castle" and is located on Castle Street. The refurbished house was opened to the public in 1996 as "Bellaghy Bawn". It is a museum featuring exhibitions on local history.

In May 1922, during the Irish War of Independence, the Irish Republican Army launched an attack on Bellaghy Royal Irish Constabulary barracks, killing an RIC officer and wounding three others. An IRA volunteer was also killed and three captured.

Notable people
Seamus Heaney, who became a Nobel Prize-winning poet, was born as the eldest of nine children at Mossbawn, his family's farm in Bellaghy. He later lived in Dublin but is buried in the graveyard of St Mary's Catholic Church, Bellaghy. The village has an arts centre dedicated to him, known as the Seamus Heaney HomePlace. The centre features talks, poetry readings, and performances. It has exhibits of photographs, texts, and poems to show the influence of place on his language.

Others to hail from the village include World Outdoor Bowls champion Margaret Johnston, international footballer Sarah McFadden and Eurovision 2022 entrant for Ireland Brooke Scullion.

Two Bellaghy natives, Francis Hughes and his cousin Thomas McElwee, died participating in the 1981 Irish hunger strike during The Troubles. They were protesting at the treatment by the British and supporting political change in Northern Ireland. Other republicans from Bellaghy include former Irish National Liberation Army (INLA) leader Dominic McGlinchey.

2001 Census
Bellaghy is classified as a Village by the Northern Ireland Statistics and Research Agency (NISRA), i.e. with population between 1,000 and 2,250 people. On Census day (29 April 2001), there were 1,063 people living in Bellaghy. Of these:
31.4% were aged under 16 years and 12.7% were aged 60 and over
49.9% of the population were male and 50.1% were female
86.0% were from a Catholic background and 14.0% were from a Protestant background
4.6% of people aged 16–74 were unemployed

See also

Bellaghy GAC

References

Villages in County Londonderry
Mid-Ulster District